The 1993 McNeese State Cowboys football team was an American football team that represented McNeese State University as a member of the Southland Conference (Southland) during the 1993 NCAA Division I-AA football season. In their fourth year under head coach Bobby Keasler, the team compiled an overall record of 10–3, with a mark of 7–0 in conference play, and finished as Southland champion. The Cowboys advanced to the Division I-AA playoffs and lost to Troy State in the quarterfinals.

Schedule

References

McNeese State
McNeese Cowboys football seasons
Southland Conference football champion seasons
McNeese State Cowboys football